Menipea is a genus of bryozoans belonging to the family Candidae.

The genus has almost cosmopolitan distribution.

Species:

Menipea biaviculata 
Menipea bicellata 
Menipea columnaris 
Menipea crassa 
Menipea crispa 
Menipea elongata 
Menipea flabellum 
Menipea flagellifera 
Menipea floccosa 
Menipea innocua 
Menipea integra 
Menipea kempi 
Menipea ligulata 
Menipea lineata 
Menipea marionensis 
Menipea multipartita 
Menipea multiseriata 
Menipea ornata 
Menipea patagonica 
Menipea retroversa 
Menipea roborata 
Menipea salvati 
Menipea simplex 
Menipea spicata 
Menipea triseriata 
Menipea uniserialis 
Menipea unyoi 
Menipea vectifera 
Menipea vera 
Menipea zelandica

References

Bryozoan genera